Antonino Cannavacciuolo (born 16 April 1975) is an Italian chef, restaurateur, writer and television personality.

Restaurants
 Villa Crespi, Orta San Giulio 
 Cannavacciuolo Café & Bistrot (Novara) 
 Bistrot Cannavacciuolo (Torino) 
 Cannavacciuolo Countryside (Vico Equense) 
 Laqua by the Lake (Pettenasco)

Television
 Cucine da incubo (2013–2015; 2016–present)
 MasterChef Italia (2015–present)
 'O mare mio (2017–present)
 Ci pensa Antonino (2017)
 Celebrity MasterChef Italia (2017–2018)
 MasterChef All Stars Italia (2018–2019)
 I menu di Cannavacciuolo (2019)
 Antonino Chef Academy (2019–present)
 Family Food Fight (2019)

Books
 In cucina comando io (2013)
 Pure tu vuoi fare lo chef? (2014)
 Il piatto forte è l'emozione. 50 ricette dal Sud al Nord (2016)
 Mettici il cuore. 50 ricette per la cucina di tutti i giorni (2017)
 A tavola si sta insieme. I menu d'autore per le tue serate in compagnia (2018)
 Tutto il sapore che vuoi. 50 ricette di cucina vegetariana (2019)
 Il pranzo di Natale. I piatti delle feste e la cucina degli avanzi (2019)
 Il meglio di Antonino (2020)

References

Italian restaurateurs
Italian television chefs
Head chefs of Michelin starred restaurants
1975 births
Living people
Writers from Naples
Italian chief executives
Italian food writers
Italian television producers
Chefs of Italian cuisine
Italian cookbook writers
Italian cuisine
Italian chefs